Taniguchi (written:  lit. "valley mouth") is the 92nd most common Japanese surname. Notable people with the surname include:

, Japanese Nordic combined skier
, Japanese anime director
, Japanese long-distance runner
, Japanese footballer
, Japanese rugby union player
, Japanese manga artist
, Japanese footballer
, Japanese sprinter
, Japanese diplomat and academic
, Japanese New Thought leader
, Japanese volleyball player
, Japanese basketball player
, Japanese motorcycle racer
, Japanese racing driver
, Japanese rugby sevens player
, Japanese scientist
, Japanese film director and screenwriter
, Japanese swimmer
, Japanese footballer
, better known as Maybach Taniguchi, Japanese professional wrestler
, Japanese atomic bomb survivor and anti-nuclear activist
, Japanese immunologist
, Japanese golfer
, Japanese architect
, Japanese architect
, Japanese shogi player
, Japanese racing driver, founder of Yuke's
, Japanese baseball player

Fictional characters
, a character in the manga series Citrus

See also
8571 Taniguchi, a main-belt asteroid

References

Japanese-language surnames